Elisabeth zu Fürstenberg (1767–1822), regent of the Fürstenberg-Fürstenberg during the minority of her son, Charles Egon II, from 1804 until 1806.

Early life 
Born into the rich House of Thurn und Taxis, was the daughter of Alexander Ferdinand, 3rd Prince of Thurn and Taxis and his third wife, Princess Maria Henriette Josepha of Fürstenberg-Stühlingen (1732–1772).

Personal life 
On 4 November 1790, in Prague, she married her cousin, Prince Karl Aloys zu Fürstenberg. They had:
 Charles Egon II, Prince of Fürstenberg (1796–1854); married Princess Amalie of Baden and had issue
 Princess Marie Leopoldine of Fürstenberg (1791–1844); married Charles Albert III, Prince of Hohenlohe-Waldenburg-Schillingsfürst and had issue
 Princess Maria Josefa of Fürstenberg (d. 1792)
 Princess Antonie of Fürstenberg (1744–1799)
 Princess Maria Anna of Fürstenberg (1798–1799)

References

Karl Siegfried Bader: Fürstin Elisabeth zu Fürstenberg im Kampf um die Erhaltung der Rechte ihres mediatisierten Hauses, in: Schriften des Vereins für Geschichte und Naturgeschichte der Baar und der angrenzenden Landesteile in Donaueschingen, XXIV. Heft 1956, Donaueschingen 1956; S. 119–153 online (PDF; 41,9 MB)

1767 births
1822 deaths
19th-century women rulers
Princesses of Thurn und Taxis
Fürstenberg (princely family)